The R566 road is a regional road in Ireland. It is a road on the Iveragh Peninsula in County Kerry. Part of the road is on the Wild Atlantic Way.

The R566 travels southwest from the N70 (Ring of Kerry) to Ballinskelligs. At Ballinskelligs, the road becomes the Skellig Ring, travelling northwest via the coast. Along this coast, high-cliffed Puffin Island, an important seabird reserve, lies just offshore. The road terminates at the R565 at Portmagee, where Valentia Island may be reached by bridge.

References

Regional roads in the Republic of Ireland
Roads in County Kerry